In mathematics, the quasi-commutative property is an extension or generalization of the general commutative property. This property is used in specific applications with various definitions.

Applied to matrices

The quasi-commutative property in matrices is defined as follows. Given two non-commutable matrices  and 

satisfy the quasi-commutative property whenever  satisfies the following properties:

An example is found in the matrix mechanics introduced by Heisenberg as a version of quantum mechanics. In this mechanics, p and q are infinite matrices corresponding respectively to the momentum and position variables of a particle. These matrices are written out at Matrix mechanics#Harmonic oscillator, and z = iħ times the infinite unit matrix, where ħ is the reduced Planck constant.

Applied to functions

A function  is said to be  if 

If  is instead denoted by  then this can be rewritten as:

See also

References

Mathematical relations
Properties of binary operations